Eric Maurice Streater (born March 21, 1964) is a former American football wide receiver in the National Football League who played for the Tampa Bay Buccaneers, appearing in 3 games as a replacement player. He played college football for the North Carolina Tar Heels. He also played in the Canadian Football League for the BC Lions and Winnipeg Blue Bombers.

References

1964 births
Living people
American football wide receivers
Canadian football wide receivers
Tampa Bay Buccaneers players
BC Lions players
People from Jackson County, North Carolina
Players of American football from North Carolina
Winnipeg Blue Bombers players
North Carolina Tar Heels football players
National Football League replacement players